Spring Lake is a small lake north-northwest of Delhi in Delaware County, New York. It drains southeast via an unnamed creek which flows into Steele Brook.

See also
 List of lakes in New York

References 

Lakes of New York (state)
Lakes of Delaware County, New York